Sixto Adalberto Tejeda Olivares (28 March 1883 – 8 September 1960) was a Mexican politician, who served two terms (1920–1924 and 1928–1932) as Governor of Veracruz. He was born in Chicontepec de Tejeda, Veracruz.

During the Mexican Revolution, Tejeda obtained the rank of lieutenant colonel. In 1918, he was elected Senator. 

Tejeda was also a diplomat. He served as the Mexican Ambassador to France (1935-1937), Spain (1937-1939), and Peru (1942).

References

1883 births
1960 deaths
Governors of Veracruz
Mexican diplomats